Kalachyovsky District is an administrative district (raion), one of the thirty-three in Volgograd Oblast, Russia. As a municipal division, it is incorporated as Kalachyovsky Municipal District. It is located in the south of the oblast. Its administrative center is the town of Kalach-na-Donu. As of the 2021 Census, the total population of the district was 47,566, with the population of Kalach-na-Donu accounting for 37,1% of that number.

History
The district was established in 1928 within Lower Volga Krai. When Lower Volga Krai was split into Stalingrad and Saratov Krais in 1934, the district remained a part of the former. In 1936, Stalingrad Krai was transformed into Stalingrad Oblast, which was renamed Volgograd Oblast in 1961.

References

Notes

Sources

Districts of Volgograd Oblast
States and territories established in 1928
